Karasye is a rural locality (a village) in Khokhlovskoye Rural Settlement, Permsky District, Perm Krai, Russia. The population was 7 as of 2010. There are 9 streets.

Geography 
Karasye is located 43 km north of Perm (the district's administrative centre) by road. Sukhaya is the nearest rural locality.

References 

Rural localities in Permsky District